Leslie Charles Hammond (4 March 1905 – 26 June 1955) was an Indian field hockey player who competed in the 1928 Summer Olympics and 1932 Summer Olympics. In 1928 he was a member of the Indian field hockey team, which won the gold medal. He played three matches as back. Four years later he was again a member of the Indian field hockey team, which won the gold medal. He played one match as back. He was born in Madras, India.

References

External links
 
 Leslie Hammond's profile at databaseOlympics
 Leslie Hammond's profile at Sports Reference.com
 

1905 births
1955 deaths
Field hockey players from Chennai
Olympic field hockey players of India
Field hockey players at the 1928 Summer Olympics
Field hockey players at the 1932 Summer Olympics
Indian male field hockey players
Olympic gold medalists for India
Anglo-Indian people
Olympic medalists in field hockey
Medalists at the 1932 Summer Olympics
Medalists at the 1928 Summer Olympics
Indian emigrants to Australia
Australian people of Anglo-Indian descent